The Type 93 Air-to-Ship Missile (93式空対艦誘導弾, ASM-2) is an air-to-ship missile developed in Japan.

This missile is used by the Japan Air Self-Defense Force.

The ASM-2 will be replaced by the ASM-3.

See also

 Type 80 Air-to-Ship Missile
 Type 88 Surface-to-Ship Missile
 Type 90 Ship-to-Ship Missile
 ASM-3

Anti-ship missiles of Japan
Anti-ship cruise missiles
Military equipment introduced in the 1990s